The 1999 United States Road Racing Championship was the second and final season of the revived United States Road Racing Championship run by the Sports Car Club of America (SCCA).  The season involved four classes: Can-Am prototypes and three Grand Touring classes referred to as GT2, GT3, and GTT.  Five races were scheduled from January 30, 1999, to October 2, 1999, but the series was cancelled after three rounds on June 6, 1999.

The USRRC season was cancelled due to a lack of competitors, mainly in the premiere Can-Am class.  The two cancelled races at the end of the season were to be run in conjunction with the FIA GT Championship, therefore USRRC GT class competitors were allowed to compete in the FIA GT race if they wished, but would not receive points as the champions had already been declared.

The following year, the new Grand American Road Racing Association agreed to take over the series from the SCCA, and renamed it the Grand American Road Racing Championship, eventually becoming the Rolex Sports Car Series.

Schedule
Five races were initially scheduled, but the final two rounds became non-championship races part of the FIA GT Championship after the USRRC folded.  These events are listed in italics.

Season results
Overall winners in bold.

References

External links
 The official website of Grand-Am
 World Sports Racing Prototypes 1999 USRRC Results

United States Road Racing Championship
United States Road Racing Championship